Australia Asia Airlines  (澳亞航空公司 Àoyà Hángkōng Gōngsī) was a wholly owned subsidiary of Qantas set up to operate services between Australia and Taiwan (Republic of China).

History
The subsidiary was established due to the People's Republic of China's objection to national carriers of countries with which it had diplomatic relations flying to Taiwan (Republic of China), which the former regarded as a breakaway province.

The airline operated two Boeing 747SPs and a Boeing 767 seconded from the Qantas fleet, repainted in a modified livery, which did not display the Flag of Australia, or the kangaroo logo, which was replaced by a dynamic ribbon. It initially flew its flights using the IATA code IM but switched to Qantas's QF in 1994.

Australia Asia Airlines ceased operations in 1996 as Qantas could by then serve Taiwan in its own right due to it being completely privatized. Australia Asia Airlines' aircraft were then returned to Qantas service.

See also
British Asia Airways
Japan Asia Airways
KLM Asia
Swissair Asia
Air France Asie
Foreign relations of Taiwan § Air links

References

External links

Qantas
Defunct airlines of Australia
Defunct airlines of Taiwan
Airlines established in 1990
Airlines disestablished in 1996
1990 establishments in Australia
1990 establishments in Taiwan
1996 disestablishments in Australia
1996 disestablishments in Taiwan
Companies based in Sydney
Australian companies disestablished in 1996